Myrciaria ibarrae, commonly known as guayabillo in Guatemala, is a species of plant in the family Myrtaceae. First described in 1961, it is a tree which grows to between 8 and 10 metres tall, and is endemic to south-east Mexico and Guatemala.

References

ibarrae
Crops originating from the Americas
Tropical fruit
Flora of Central America
Cauliflory
Fruit trees
Berries
Plants described in 1961